The Taichung Literature Museum (TLM) is a museum in West District, Taichung, Taiwan.

History
The museum buildings were originally constructed as a police dormitory in 1934 during the Japanese rule of Taiwan. In 2009, the buildings were designated as historical buildings by Cultural Affairs Bureau of Taichung City Government. In April 2010, the buildings were renovated by the city government and turned into the Taichung Literature Museum to honor literature contribution and promote literature in Taiwan. The museum exterior part and premises were opened to the public in April 2015 and the museum was fully opened on 26 Augusts 2016.

Architecture
The museum consists of a literature park and six buildings, which are:
 permanent exhibition
 themed exhibition
 children's literature
 workshops and lectures
 themed eatery area
 administration office

Transportation
The museum is accessible by bus from Taichung Station of Taiwan High Speed Rail or Taichung TRA station of Taiwan Railways.

See also
 List of museums in Taiwan

References

External links

 

2016 establishments in Taiwan
Literary museums in Taiwan
Museums in Taichung
Museums established in 2016